Civil Supplies Departments are government departments in the centre and states of India which governs the supply of commodities in the nation and the respective states.

 Civil Supplies Department of Tamil Nadu
 Civil Supplies Department of Kerala
Andhra Pradesh State Civil Supplies Corporation Limited

References  

State civil supplies departments of India